Dearne FM was a local radio station serving Barnsley. The station was folded into Greatest Hits Radio Yorkshire, as part of a rebrand, on 1 September 2020.

History
The station was based at Zenith Park on Whaley Road, Barugh Green, in the north-west of Barnsley. As a result of cost cutting, Dearne FM co-located with sister stations Trax FM, Rother FM and Ridings FM at studios on White Rose Way in Doncaster. Five other companies competed for Barnsley's FM radio licence.

Transmitters
The station could be heard on 102 FM  near Ardsley) in Barnsley and the Dearne Valley, and on 97.1 FM (near Hoylandswaine close to the A628 and A629 roundabout) for Penistone on Hunger Hill. The Ardsley transmitter also broadcast Hallam FM on 102.9 FM, with whom Dearne FM mainly competed. The 102 FM signal is more powerful than 97.1 FM, which is an off-air relay of 102 FM.

Programming
Dearne FM appealed to a family audience playing a mix of current chart hits and the best songs from the 1960s, 1970s, 1980s, 1990s, 2000s and today combined with local news, information and competitions.

External links
 
 Transmitter map
 Penistone transmitter
 Media UK
 Applications for the Barnsley FM radio licence
 Getting the licence in January 2003

Radio stations in Yorkshire
Mass media in Barnsley
Radio stations established in 2003
Bauer Radio